The Central District of Kermanshah County is a district (bakhsh) in Kermanshah County, Kermanshah Province, Iran. At the 2006 census, its population was 888,990 in 222,022 families.  The district has one city: Kermanshah. The district has six rural districts (dehestan): Baladarband Rural District, Dorudfaraman Rural District, Miyan Darband Rural District, Poshtdarband Rural District, Qarah Su Rural District, and Razavar Rural District.

References 

Kermanshah County
Districts of Kermanshah Province